The Wabash Cannonball Trail is a rail to trail conversion in northwestern Ohio, U.S.  It is  long.  The North Fork of the Wabash Cannonball Trail is part of the North Coast Inland Trail, which plans to fully connect Indiana to Pennsylvania, and portions of the trail are included in the North Country National Scenic Trail.

History

The Wabash Railroad line used by the trail was first built in 1855, and service continued until 1969. The Norfolk Southern Railway then purchased it. The rails were finally abandoned in 1990. Local enthusiasts developed the idea of creating a public recreational trail and utility corridor. On March 24, 1994, the corridor was purchased from Norfolk Southern.

The name Wabash Cannonball stems from an 1882 American folk song about an imaginary train. No train actually had the name until 1949, when the Wabash Railroad actually named its Detroit-St. Louis day train the Cannon Ball.

Other rail-to-trail conversions of the Wabash Railroad in the Midwestern region include the Kiwanis Trail in Adrian, Michigan, the Wabash Heritage Trail in West Lafayette, Indiana, and the Wabash Trail in Sangamon County, Illinois.

Location

North Fork
The northern section of the trail roughly parallels both the Ohio Turnpike I-80/90 and US Route 20A for about  starting in Maumee, and extending through Monclova, Wauseon, and West Unity, ending at its western trailhead near Montpelier, Ohio.

South Fork
An additional  spur runs from Maumee southwest to near Liberty Center, Ohio. That trailhead has a parking area near Whitehouse, Ohio.

Condition
All portions of the trail in Lucas County are paved.  A  section of the trail in Fulton County, owned by the city of Wauseon, also is paved.  The remainder of the North Fork in Fulton and Williams counties are unpaved, as is the South Fork in Henry County.

Note that distance information about the trail differs slightly from one source to another based on whether missing sections of the trail are counted or not.

References

External links
 Traillink: Wabash Cannonball Trail, North and South Fork
 Google Maps: Wabash Cannonball Trail (North Fork)
 Google Maps: Wabash Cannonball Trail (South Fork)

Rail trails in Ohio
Protected areas of Fulton County, Ohio
Protected areas of Lucas County, Ohio
Tourist attractions in Fulton County, Ohio
Tourist attractions in Lucas County, Ohio
Tourist attractions in Henry County, Ohio
Tourist attractions in Toledo, Ohio
Protected areas of Henry County, Ohio
Bike paths in Ohio
Rail trails in the United States
Metroparks Toledo